The 8th Army Corps was one of three army corps of the Ukrainian Ground Forces. The Corps was headquartered in Zhytomyr, Ukraine. In 2015 all army corps were dissolved, and their units were transferred under jurisdiction of the operation command.

On 1 December 1993, after the dissolution of the Soviet Union, the 8th Army Corps was formed by the redesignation of the 8th Tank Army. The 23rd Tank Division at Ovruch became the 6065th Base for Storage of Weapons and Equipment, and the 117th Training Tank Division later became the 119th District Training Centre. The 30th Tank Division became a Ukrainian mechanised brigade.

In March 2015, the 8th Army Corps was disbanded and its subordinate units transferred to other commands.

Structure

Commanders

References

External links
 Official website

Corps of Ukraine
Military units and formations established in 1993
Military units and formations disestablished in 2015